Glenea morosa is a species of beetle in the family Cerambycidae. It was described by Francis Polkinghorne Pascoe in 1888, originally under the genus Volumnia.

References

morosa
Beetles described in 1888